The TechCast Project uses collective intelligence to forecast emerging technologies, social trends and wild cards for planners and decision makers. Founded at George Washington University years ago, their website (www.techcastproject.com) pools background data and the knowledge of 130 experts worldwide to forecast breakthroughs in all fields and to assess their economic and social impact. Results are subscribed to corporations, governments, and the public around the globe.

The TechCast forecasting system was developed by Professor William E. Halal and his associates at George Washington University and George Mason University. An earlier version called "The GW Forecast" was conducted by mail, but the online version has been operating since 1998. TechCast researchers and editors scan the literature and media, interview authorities, and draw on various other sources to identify trends and  background data on roughly 100 forecasts covering the entire strategic landscape. This data is summarized to guide the estimates of 130 plus technology officers, research scientists and engineers, scholars, and other experts to estimate of the most likely year each breakthrough will occur, the potential economic demand, social impact, and experts' confidence.

TechCast is somewhat unusual in that it tries to carry forecasting to the level of a global advisory service that provides authoritative forecasts covering all fields and updated in real time. The forecasts are also validated annually by comparing them to actual arrivals over the past 20 years, showing that results are accurate within roughly +/- 3 years. The research method is quite general, so it can be used to forecast almost anything, and the process enhances understanding.

The project has been recognized as possibly the best forecasting system in the world. The U.S. national Academies cited it as one of the top-three systems available. It was awarded First Prize in an AOL competition for creative IT research, and has been featured in The Washington Post, Newsweek, The Futurist, and scientific publications. Its panel of experts has conducted customized studies for the U.S. Federal agencies, Corning, AMD, Asian Development Bank, Saudi Arabia, Korea, Singapore, and Kuala Lumpur.

References

Persistent Forecasting of Disruptive Technologies (Washington, DC: U.S. National Academies of Science and Engineering, 2009)
William E. Halal, Technology’s Promise: Expert Knowledge on the Transformation of Business and Society (London: Palgrave Macmillan, 2008)
Halal at al, “The GW Forecast of Emerging Technologies,” Technology Forecasting & Social Change (1998) Vol. 59, pp. 89-110

External links

Blog

George Washington University
Think tanks based in Washington, D.C.